Cha cha cha is a 2013 Italian crime-thriller film directed by Marco Risi. Loosely inspired by the works of Raymond Chandler, it premiered at the 2013 Taormina Film Fest.

Cast 
 Luca Argentero: Corso
 Eva Herzigová: Michelle
 Claudio Amendola: Torre
 Pippo Delbono: Lawyer Argento
 Bebo Storti: Massa
 Marco Leonardi: Photographer
 Pietro Ragusa: Muschio
 Shel Shapiro: Himself 
 Nino Frassica

Production and Distribution
The movie was produced by BiBi Film, Babe Films and RAI Cinema. The post-production was carried out by Reset VFX S.r.l.
The distribution of the movie is by 01 Distribution.

References

External links

2013 films
Italian crime thriller films
2013 crime thriller films
Films set in Rome
Films directed by Marco Risi
Italian neo-noir films
2010s Italian films
2010s Italian-language films